Maksim Pyatrovich Karpovich (born 27 February 1986) is a retired Belarusian professional footballer. His latest club was Vitebsk.

Honours
Naftan Novopolotsk
Belarusian Cup winner: 2008–09, 2011–12

External links

1986 births
Living people
Belarusian footballers
Belarusian expatriate footballers
Expatriate footballers in Ukraine
Ukrainian Premier League players
Belarusian expatriate sportspeople in Ukraine
FC Slavia Mozyr players
FC Naftan Novopolotsk players
FC Savit Mogilev players
FC Dnepr Mogilev players
FC Vorskla Poltava players
FC Torpedo-BelAZ Zhodino players
FC Belshina Bobruisk players
FC Granit Mikashevichi players
FC Vitebsk players
Association football midfielders
People from Lida
Sportspeople from Grodno Region